Yago César da Silva (born 26 May 1997), known as Yago, is a Brazilian footballer who plays as a forward for Ituano, on loan from Athletico Paranaense.

Club career
On 29 July 2019, Yago joined Primeira Liga club Paços de Ferreira on a season-long loan with an option to buy.

References

External links

1997 births
Footballers from São Paulo (state)
Living people
Brazilian footballers
Association football forwards
Campeonato Brasileiro Série A players
Campeonato Brasileiro Série B players
Campeonato Paranaense players
Club Athletico Paranaense players
Esporte Clube Juventude players
Ituano FC players
Cuiabá Esporte Clube players
Centro Sportivo Alagoano players
Guarani FC players
Liga MX players
Lobos BUAP footballers
Primeira Liga players
F.C. Paços de Ferreira players
Brazilian expatriate footballers
Brazilian expatriate sportspeople in Mexico
Brazilian expatriate sportspeople in Portugal
Expatriate footballers in Mexico
Expatriate footballers in Portugal
People from Taboão da Serra